Ants (family Formicidae in the order Hymenoptera) are the most species-rich of all social insects, with more than 12,000 described species and many others awaiting description. Formicidae is divided into 21 subfamilies, of which 17 are extant and four subfamilies are extinct, described from fossils.  In total more than 300 genera have been described. Ants have come to occupy virtually all major terrestrial habitats, with the exception of tundra and cold ever-wet forests. They display a wide range of social behaviors, foraging habits and associations with other organisms, which has generated scientific and public interest.

The following is a list of worldwide ant genera organised by subfamily.

Key

Subfamilies

Agroecomyrmecinae
The subfamily Agroecomyrmecinae represents two extinct genera and two fossil genera, once widespread in both hemispheres during the early Tertiary. The subfamily was originally classified as Agroecomyrmecini, a Myrmicinae tribe until English myrmecologist Barry Bolton raised the tribe to subfamily status in 2003. Most specimens collected are from Central America and Mexico, although one type specimen of an Agroecomyrmecinae species was collected from Ghana.

Amblyoponinae
The subfamily Amblyoponinae represents nine extant genera and one fossil genus. Established by Swiss myrmecologist Auguste Forel in 1893, these ants are specialist predators, distributed worldwide in the tropics.

Aneuretinae
The subfamily Aneuretinae represents one extant genus and eight fossil genera established by Italian entomologist Carlo Emery in 1913. Only a single species of this subfamily is extant, the Sri Lankan relict ant (Aneuretus simoni), endemic to Sri Lanka.

Apomyrminae
The subfamily Apomyrminae contains the single genus Apomyrma which only has one species, the rare subterranean ant Apomyrma stygia from West Africa. Several undescribed species are known to exist, all from tropical Africa.

Brownimeciinae
The subfamily Brownimeciinae contains the single genus Brownimecia which only has one species, Brownimecia clavata. It was described in 1997 after a fossilised specimen was collected from Cretaceous amber from New Jersey, and was initially placed in the subfamily Ponerinae. The species was later classified into its own subfamily in 2003 by Barry Bolton.

Dolichoderinae
The subfamily Dolichoderinae was established by Forel in 1878, which represents 28 extant genera and 20 fossil genera. The subfamily presents a great diversity of species throughout the world, mainly in the tropics. Most species are generalised scavengers, but some are predacious.

Dorylinae
The subfamily Dorylinae was established by Leach in 1815, which represents 27 extant genera and one fossil genus. Many species of ant in this subfamily are known as army ants that are distributed in the Old World and New World.

Ectatomminae
The subfamily Ectatomminae represents four extant genera and three fossil genera, established in 1895 by Carlo Emery. They are distributed in tropical and warm climates in the New World and Old World, as well as the Indo-Australian regions.

Formiciinae
The subfamily Formiciinae represents one extinct genus of ants dating back to the Eocene. Ants of the genus Titanomyrma are the largest ants ever known, with queen specimens the size of small hummingbirds. Fossils have been collected from the state of Wyoming and in Germany.

Formicinae
The subfamily Formicinae represents 51 extant genera and 30 fossil genera that are globally distributed. Established by French zoologist Pierre André Latreille in 1809, the subfamily has more than 3,000 described species, placing it as the second largest ant subfamily. Despite this, the hyperdiverse genus Camponotus is the most diverse group of ants in the world, with more than 1,100 species described.
 
{| class="wikitable sortable" style="width:100%;text-align:center"
!colspan="100%" align="center" bgcolor=#d3d3a4|Subfamily Formicinae Latreille, 1809 – 82 genera, 3,243 species
|-
!Genus name!!Binomial authority!!Classified!!No. of species!!Type species!!class="unsortable"|Example image!!class="unsortable"|
|-
|Acropyga
|Roger
|1862
|41
|Acropyga acutiventris
|Acropyga acutiventris
|
|-
|Agraulomyrmex
|Prins
|1983
|2
|Agraulomyrmex meridionalis
|Agraulomyrmex meridionalis
|
|-
|Alloformica
|Dlussky
|1969
|4
|Alloformica aberrans
|Alloformica aberrans
|
|-
|Anoplolepis
|Santschi
|1914
|9
|Anoplolepis gracilipes
|Anoplolepis gracilipes
|
|-
|Aphomomyrmex
|Emery
|1899
|1
|Aphomomyrmex afer
|Aphomomyrmex afer
|
|-
|
|Heer
|1850
|1
|
|Attopsis longipennis
|
|-
|Bajcaridris
|Agosti
|1994
|3
|Bajcaridris theryi
|Bajcaridris theryi
|
|-
|Brachymyrmex
|Mayr
|1868
|44
|Brachymyrmex patagonicus
|Brachymyrmex patagonicus
|
|-
|Bregmatomyrma
|Wheeler
|1929
|1
|Bregmatomyrma carnosa
|Bregmatomyrma carnosa
|
|-
|Calomyrmex
|Emery
|1895
|9
|Calomyrmex laevissimus
|Calomyrmex laevissimus
|
|-
|
|Steinbach
|1967
|5
|
|†Camponotites silvestris
|
|-
|Camponotus
|Mayr
|1861
|1131
|Camponotus ligniperda
|Camponotus ligniperda
|
|-
|Cataglyphis
|Förster
|1850
|91
|Cataglyphis bicolor
|Cataglyphis bicolor
|
|-
|
|Dlussky
|2008
|2
|
|†Cataglyphoides constrictus
|
|-
|
|Dlussky
|1988
|1
|
|
|
|-
|Cladomyrma
|Wheeler
|1920
|13
|Cladomyrma hewitti
|Cladomyrma hewitti
|
|-
|
|Dlussky
|2008
|1
|
|
|
|-
|
|Hong
|2002
|1
|
|
|
|-
|Dinomyrmex
|Ashmead
|1905
|1
|Formica gigas
|
|
|-
|
|Wheeler
|1915
|2
|
|†Drymomyrmex fuscipennis
|
|-
|Echinopla
|Smith
|1857
|33
|Echinopla melanarctos
|Echinopla melanarctos
|
|-
|
|Hong
|2002
|2
|
|
|
|-
|Euprenolepis
|Emery
|1906
|8
|Euprenolepis procera
|Euprenolepis procera
|
|-
|
|Hong
|2002
|1
|
|
|
|-
|Formica
|Linnaeus
|1758
|234
|Formica rufa
|Formica rufa
|
|-
|
|Hong
|2002
|1
|
|
|
|-
|Gesomyrmex
|Mayr
|1868
|17
|
|†Gesomyrmex hoernesi
|
|-
|Gigantiops
|Roger
|1863
|1
|Gigantiops destructor
|Gigantiops destructor
|
|-
|
|Wheeler
|1915
|1
|
|†Glaphyromyrmex oligocenicus
|
|-
|
|Dlussky & Putyatina
|2014
|1
|
|
|
|-
|
|Hong
|2002
|1
|
|
|
|-
|Iberoformica
|Tinaut
|1990
|2
|Iberoformica subrufa
|Iberoformica subrufa
|
|-
|
|Heer
|1850
|2
|
|
|
|-
|
|Grimaldi & Agosti
|2000
|1
|
|†Kyromyrma neffi
|
|-
|Lasiophanes
|Emery
|1895
|6
|Lasiophanes atriventris
|Lasiophanes atriventris
|
|-
|Lasius
|Fabricius
|1804
|134
|
|†Formica nigra
|
|-
|Lepisiota
|Santschi
|1926
|81
|Lepisiota rothneyi
|Lepisiota rothneyi
|
|-
|
|Hong
|2002
|1
|
|
|
|-
|
|Donisthorpe
|1920
|2
|
|†Leucotaphus gurnetensiss|
|-
|
|Hong
|2002
|1
|
|
|
|-
|
|Hong
|2002
|2
|
|
|
|-
|
|Hong
|2002
|1
|
|
|
|-
|Melophorus|Lubbock
|1883
|23
|Melophorus bagoti|Melophorus bagoti|
|-
|Myrmecocystus|Wesmael
|1838
|29
|Myrmecocystus mexicanus|Myrmecocystus mexicanus|
|-
|Myrmecorhynchus|André
|1896
|3
|Myrmecorhynchus emeryi|Myrmecorhynchus emeryi|
|-
|Myrmelachista|Roger
|1863
|56
|Myrmelachista kraatzii|Myrmelachista kraatzii|
|-
|Myrmoteras|Forel
|1893
|41
|Myrmoteras binghamii|Myrmoteras binghamii|
|-
|Notoncus|Emery
|1895
|6
|Notoncus ectatommoide|Notoncus ectatommoide|
|-
|Notostigma|Emery
|1920
|2
|Notostigma carazzii|Notostigma carazzii|
|-
|Nylanderia|Emery
|1906
|110
|Nylanderia vividula|Nylanderia vividula|
|-
|Oecophylla|Smith
|1860
|15
|Oecophylla smaragdina|Oecophylla smaragdina|
|-
|Opisthopsis|Dalla Torre
|1893
|13
|Myrmecopsis respiciens|Opisthopsis respiciens|
|-
|
|Hong
|2002
|1
|
|
|
|-
|
|Hong
|2002
|1
|
|
|
|-
|
|Hong
|2002
|1
|
|
|
|-
|Overbeckia|Viehmeyer
|1916
|1
|Overbeckia subclavata|Overbeckia subclavata|
|-
|Paraparatrechina|Donisthorpe
|1947
|36
|Paratrechina pallida|Paraparatrechina pallida|
|-
|Paratrechina|Motschoulsky
|1863
|5
|Paratrechina currens|Paratrechina longicornis|
|-
|Petalomyrmex|Snelling
|1979
|1
|Petalomyrmex phylax|Petalomyrmex phylax|
|-
|Plagiolepis|Mayr
|1861
|72
|Formica pygmaea|Plagiolepis pygmaea|
|-
|Polyergus|Latreille
|1804
|14
|Formica rufescens|Polyergus rufescens|
|-
|Polyrhachis|Smith
|1857
|698
|Formica bihamata|Polyrhachis bihamata|
|-
|Prenolepis|Mayr
|1861
|17
|Tapinoma nitens|Prenolepis nitens|
|-
|
|Wheeler
|1915
|1
|
|†Prodimorphomyrmex primigenius|
|-
|Proformica|Ruzsky
|1902
|25
|Formica nasuta|Proformica nasuta|
|-
|Prolasius|Forel
|1892
|19
|Formica advena|Prolasius advena|
|-
|†Protoformica|Dlussky
|1967
|1
|
|
|
|-
|
|Wilson
|1985
|1
|
|†Protrechina carpenteri|
|-
|
|Carpenter
|1930
|1
|
|†Pseudocamponotus elkoanus|
|-
|Pseudolasius|Emery
|1887
|50
|Formica familiaris|Pseudolasius familiaris|
|-
|Pseudonotoncus|Clark
|1934
|2
|Pseudonotoncus hirsutus|Pseudonotoncus hirsutus|
|-
|Rossomyrmex|Arnol'di
|1928
|4
|Rossomyrmex proformicarum|Rossomyrmex proformicarum|
|-
|Santschiella|Forel
|1916
|1
|Santschiella kohli|Santschiella kohli|
|-
|
|Wheeler
|1915
|1
|
|†Sicilomyrmex corniger|
|-
|
|Hong
|2002
|1
|
|
|
|-
|
|Hong
|2002
|1
|
|
|
|-
|Stigmacros|Forel
|1905
|49
|Acantholepis froggatti|Stigmacros froggatti|
|-
|Tapinolepis|Emery
|1925
|14
|Plagiolepis tumidula|Tapinolepis tumidula|
|-
|Teratomyrmex|McAreavey
|1957
|3
|Teratomyrmex greavesi|Teratomyrmex greavesi|
|-
|
|Hong
|2002
|2
|
|
|
|-
|Zatania|LaPolla, Kallal & Brady
|2012
|6
|Paratrechina cisipa|Zatania albimaculata|
|-
|}

Haidomyrmecinae
The subfamily Haidomyrmecinae contains 9 fossil genera of specialized ants described from Cretaceous ambers.  The Subfamily was previously treated as the tribe Haidomyrmecini and placed within Sphecomyrminae.  The tribe was elevated to a subfamily in 2020.

Heteroponerinae
The subfamily Heteroponerinae represents three extant genera of ants, established in 2003 when Barry Bolton divided the subfamily Ponerinae into six subfamilies. These ants are known from the Neotropics of Central America and South America while Aulacopone relicta is from Azerbaijan.

Leptanillinae
The subfamily Leptanillinae represents nine extant genera of ants, established in 1910 by Carlo Emery. They are subterranean ants from Africa, Europe and a single species known from Australia. Studies about their biology is minimal.

Martialinae
The subfamily Martialinae contains the single genus Martialis which only has one species, Martialis heureka. The ant was discovered in 2000 Amazon rainforest near Manaus, Brazil. Described in 2008, the ant belongs to the oldest known distinct lineage to have diverged from the ancestors of all other ants.

Myrmeciinae
The subfamily Myrmeciinae represents two extant genera and five fossil genera that were once found worldwide. Established by Carlo Emery in 1877, the extant genera are restricted to Australia, New Caledonia and New Zealand. The notorious ant genus Myrmecia is known for their venomous stings and aggression, which has caused several human deaths in sensitive people.

Myrmicinae
The subfamily Myrmicinae was established by Lepeletier de Saint-Fargeau in 1835. It represents 142 extant genera and 36 fossil genera that are distributed globally. It is the largest subfamily of the Formicidae, with more than 6,758 species described. The seed-harvesting ants and fungus-growing ants are well known among the Myrmicines.
  

Paraponerinae
The subfamily Paraponerinae contains a single genus Paraponera. This genus has two species, one of which was found in Dominican amber from the Miocene. The extant species, Paraponera clavata, is found in Central America and South America, and the pain from its sting is said to be greater than any other insect sting on earth.

Ponerinae
The subfamily Ponerinae was established by Lepeletier de Saint-Fargeau in 1835, which represents 47 extant genera and 12 fossil genera. The subfamily is among the most diverse in the family Formicidae, with more than 1,000 species described. They are mostly distributed in the tropics and subtropics.

Proceratiinae
The subfamily Proceratiinae was established by Italian entomologist Carlo Emery in 1895, which represents three extant genera and one extinct genus. Found worldwide, these ants are mainly encountered in tropical and subtropical areas. Little is known about their biology.

Pseudomyrmecinae
The subfamily Pseudomyrmecinae was established by M.R. Smith in 1952, which represents three genera of ants that are primarily arboreal nesting ants in the tropical and subtropical regions. They are found in Africa, Asia, Australia, North America and South America.

Sphecomyrminae
The subfamily Sphecomyrminae contains 9 fossil genera of stem ants. Most fossilized ants from Cretaceous amber were placed in this subfamily, however revisions in 2017 and 2020 removed several genera and added former members of the subfamily Armaniinae.

Incertae sedis
There are several ant genera where their taxonomic placement is uncertain (incertae sedis). These genera have not yet been assigned to any subfamily within Formicidae; 16 genera are currently listed as incertae sedis.

Formerly included in Formicidae
There are several genera which were formerly placed in Formicidae, but have subsequently been removed. These genera are now placed in other families, are considered incertae sedis'' within Hymenoptera taxonomy, or are considered invalid.

See also
List of ant subfamilies

Notes

References

Genera